Dazaifu may refer to:

 Dazaifu, Fukuoka, a city in northern Kyūshū
 Dazaifu (government), the regional government in northern Kyūshū